The Girl in the Rain (Swedish: Flickan i regnet) is a 1955 Swedish drama film directed by Alf Kjellin and starring Marianne Bengtsson, Kjellin, Annika Tretow and Gunnel Lindblom. It was shot at the Centrumateljéerna Studios in Stockholm. The film's sets were designed by the art director Nils Nilsson.

Cast
 Marianne Bengtsson as Anna Rydell
 Alf Kjellin as 	Martin Andreasson
 Annika Tretow as 	Gerd Andreasson
 Gunnel Lindblom as 	Ingrid
 Märta Dorff as 	Matron
 Renée Björling as 	Maria, Principal 
 Ingvar Kjellson as 	Klas
 Carl Ström as 	Johan, Teacher
 Arne Källerud as Karlsson, Janitor
 Kerstin Wibom as 	Ms. Linde
 Birgitta Andersson as 	Taje
 Pia Skoglund as 	Bisse
 Bibi Andersson as	Lilly 
 Mona Malm as 	Britt-Marie
 Ittla Frodi as 	Mirre
 Monica Nielsen as 	Ping-Pong
 Lena Söderblom as 	Burret
 Eva Laräng as 	Kerstin
 Elisabeth Liljenroth as 	Student
 Anne-Marie Hilton as 	Margareta
 Inger Axö as 	Birgitta
 Yvonne Axö as 	Marianne
 Birgitta Orling as 	Bibban
 Ing-Margret Lackne as 	Gunnel
 Barbro Dahlberg as 	Student
 Margareta Nyströmer as Agneta
 Ingrid Jellart as 	Beatrice 'Grynet' Hamilton
 Solveig Hedengran as 	Teacher at the Corridor

References

Bibliography 
 Qvist, Per Olov & von Bagh, Peter. Guide to the Cinema of Sweden and Finland. Greenwood Publishing Group, 2000.

External links 
 

1955 films
Swedish drama films
1955 drama films
1950s Swedish-language films
Films directed by Alf Kjellin
Swedish black-and-white films
1950s Swedish films